Läurelin Fourcade (born September 4, 1988) is a French rugby union, and rugby sevens player.

She competed at the 2011 Women's Six Nations Championship, 2013 Women's Six Nations Championship, 2018 Rugby World Cup Sevens, 2011 end-of-year women's rugby union tests, and 2013 mid-year women's rugby union tests.

She played for Les Pink Rockets.

With Anaïs Lagougine, she made trips to Togo.

References 

1988 births
French female rugby union players
French rugby sevens players
Living people